Desperate Character is the first solo album of British singer-songwriter Kirsty MacColl, released in 1981.  The album was re-released in March 1985 as Kirsty MacColl, with three tracks replaced with other songs. The album has been remastered and received a CD release for the first time on 8 October 2012 on the Union Square Music label and features the original twelve track listing.

Critical reception

Upon release, Robin Denselow of The Guardian commented: "MacColl enlivened the hit parade earlier this summer with the witty "There's a Guy Works Down the Chip Shop Swears He's Elvis", but hasn't quite developed the range necessary to fill an LP. The melodies are mostly pleasant and straightforward but even more adventurous lyrics are needed. She's certain got songwriting potential." Aberdeen Press and Journal stated: "Having successfully got herself into the public gaze with her unlikely single, Kirsty sounds as if she could make a bigger name for herself with this album. There is not much original in the content, but she has an interesting delivery and sounds as if she could do great things with better material."

Johnny Black of Smash Hits felt the "well-respected" musicians playing on the album ensured a "musically competent outing", but added "the melodies are so derivative that it seems Kirsty has nothing original to offer." Simon Mares of the Reading Evening Post wrote: "It's not that her country-rock totally lacks style, it's that so many others do it better." Glyn Havard, Lu Edmonds and Gavin Povey were the Belvederes who backed Jane Aire (Jane Ashley) and MacColl has sung backing vocals in 1979, subsequently becoming the Edge.

Track listing
All tracks composed by Kirsty MacColl; except where indicated

Desperate Character (1981)

 "Clock Goes Round" – 2:33
 "See That Girl" – 2:59
 "There's a Guy Works Down the Chip Shop Swears He's Elvis" (MacColl, Philip Rambow) – 3:04
 "Teenager in Love" – 2:33
 "Mexican Sofa" (MacColl, Lu Edmonds) – 3:11
 "Until the Night" (MacColl, Phil Johnstone) – 3:07
 "Falling For Faces" (MacColl, Edmonds) – 2:28
 "Just One Look" (Doris Payne, Gregory Carroll) – 2:17
 "The Real Ripper" (MacColl, Edmonds) – 3:20
 "Hard To Believe" – 2:17
 "He Thinks I Still Care" (Royden D. Lipscombe, Steve Duffy) – 2:54
 "There's a Guy Works Down the Chip Shop Swears He's Elvis" (country version) (MacColl, Rambow) – 3:42

Kirsty MacColl (1985)
  
Kirsty MacColl is essentially a reworked version of Desperate Character, with the following changes:

"Mexican Sofa", "Just One Look" and the country version of "There's a Guy Works Down the Chip Shop Swears He's Elvis"  were dropped.
The previously unissued tracks "Annie", "Roman Gardens" and "Berlin" were substituted in their places. 
For a "Special Edition" release of the album, two additional previously unissued tracks were added: "Man With No Name" and "Sleepless Nights". 
All previously unissued tracks were recorded in January 1983 at the sessions for MacColl's shelved second album Real. "Berlin" was later re-recorded for a one-off single on North of Watford Records, released in August 1983.

 "Clock Goes Round" – 2:33
 "See That Girl" – 2:59
 "There's a Guy Works Down the Chip Shop Swears He's Elvis" (MacColl, Rambow) – 3:04
 "Teenager in Love" – 2:33
 "Annie" – 4:33
 "Until the Night" (MacColl, Johnstone) – 3:07
 "Falling For Faces" (MacColl, Edmonds) – 2:28
 "Roman Gardens" (Hamish MacColl, Gavin Povey) – 3:57
 "The Real Ripper" (MacColl, Edmonds) – 3:20
 "Hard To Believe" – 2:17
 "He Thinks I Still Care" (Lipscombe, Duffy) – 2:54
 "Berlin" – 3:34
 "Man With No Name" *
 "Sleepless Nights" *

(* Special Edition only)

Personnel
Musicians
Kirsty MacColl – vocals
Lu Edmonds – guitar 
Billy Bremner – guitar, background vocals 
Malcolm Morley – guitar 
Phil Rambow – guitar 
Barry "Bazza" Farmer – guitar
Glyn Havard – bass 
Paul Riley – bass
Gavin Povey – piano
Lee Partis – drums
Ben Mandelson – fiddle
"Irish" John Earle – tenor and baritone saxophone
Ray Beavis – tenor saxophone
Chris Gower – trombone
Dick Hanson – trumpet
Lew Lewis – harmonica (credited as "vamping")
Blanche McAdorey – background vocals
Technical
Barry "Bazza" Farmer – producer, mixing 
Kirsty MacColl – mixing
Rob O'Connor – design, art direction
Alan Ballard – cover photography
John Anderson – hand tinting 
Kirsty MacColl previously unissued tracks
Dave Jordan – producer 
Philip Bodger – engineer 
Recorded at Regents Park Studios

Charts

References

External links
Desperate Character at Kirsty MacColl.com
Kirsty MacColl at Kirsty MacColl.com

1981 debut albums
1985 albums
Kirsty MacColl albums
Polydor Records albums
New wave albums by English artists